The 2013–14 Biathlon World Cup – World Cup 7 is held in Pokljuka, Slovenia, from March 6 until March 9, 2014.

Schedule of events

Medal winners

Men 
{| class="wikitable" width=85%
|Event:
|style="text-align:center;background-color:gold;"|Gold:
|style="text-align:center;background-color:gold;"|Time
|style="text-align:center;background-color:silver;"|Silver:
|style="text-align:center;background-color:silver;"|Time
|style="text-align:center;background-color:#CC9966;"|Bronze:
|style="text-align:center;background-color:#CC9966;"|Time
|-
| 10 km Sprintdetails
|Björn Ferry|| 25:03.5(0+1)
|Anton Shipulin|| 25:05.0(0+0)
|Arnd Peiffer|| 25:06.2(0+1) 
|-
| 12.5 km Pursuitdetails
|Anton Shipulin|| 31:02.8(1+0+0+0)
|Björn Ferry|| 31:11.4(1+1+0+0)
|Ole Einar Bjørndalen|| 31:30.2(0+1+0+1) 
|-
| 15 km Mass Startdetails
|Björn Ferry|| 35:19.3(0+0+0+0) 
|Martin Fourcade|| 35:24.0(0+0+0+0)
|Evgeny Ustyugov|| 35:31.8(0+0+0+0)
|}

 Women 

Achievements

 Best performance for all time

 , 27th place in Sprint
 , 57th place in Pursuit
 , 70th place in Sprint
 , 80th place in Sprint
 , 88th place in Sprint
 ''', 1st place in Sprint
 , 2nd place in Sprint
 , 9th place in Sprint
 , 10th place in Sprint
 , 15thplace in Sprint
 , 19th place in Sprint
 , 20th place in Sprint
 , 38th place in Pursuit
 , 42nd place in Sprint
 , 50th place in Pursuit

 First World Cup race

References 

2013–14 Biathlon World Cup
2014 in Slovenian sport
2013-14 Biathlon World Cup
March 2014 sports events in Europe